Alsodeiopsis schumannii is a species of plant in the Icacinaceae family. It is endemic to Tanzania, specifically the East Usambara, the Uluguru Mountains, and the Southern Highlands.

The fruit, an oblong drupe ripening to orange-red, is edible with sweet and juicy pulp around the hard stone.

References

Flora of Tanzania
schumannii
Vulnerable plants
Taxonomy articles created by Polbot
Fruits originating in Africa